Jose "Joe" Gallardo (born September 22, 1939) is an American jazz musician and composer.

Awards and honors
 2008: South Texas Music Walk of Fame

Discography

As leader
 1975: Sol - Sol
 1981: Latino Blue 
 2002: A Latin Shade of Blue
 2004: Latin Jazz Latino with the NDR Big Band

As sideman
With Luis Gasca
 1968: The Little Giant
 1974: Born to Love You
 1976: Collage

With Little Joe y La Familia
 1972: Para La Gente
 1973: Total

With Mongo Santamaria
 1975: Mongo / Lady Guajira 
 1977: Dawn (Amanecer)Feat Ruben Blades on Vocals

With Roberto Santamaria
 2013: Fiesta Al Jazz
 2015: The Conga King

With others
 1971: Arnett Cobb - The Wild Man from Texas
 1973: La Tortilla Factory - La Tortilla Factory
 1979: Mel Lewis and New Quintet - The New Mel Lewis Quintet Live 
 1988: Peter Herbolzheimer Rhythm Combination & Brass - Live in Concert Peter Herbolzheimer Rhythm Combination & Brass
 2005: Pee Wee Ellis - Different Rooms 
 2012: Jerry Tilitz & Joe Gallardo - An Exciting Jazz Trombone Summit
 2015: The Windwalkers - The Windwalkers

 Most Notable Songs:Dawn (Amanecer)Composer: Won Grammy- (Mongo Santamaría Feat Ruben Blades on Vocals

Las Nubes: Little Joe y La Familia-Chicano/Tejano Anthem Producer & Arranger

 La Malagueña: Tortilla Factory- Producer & Arranger

References

1939 births
People from Corpus Christi, Texas
Latin jazz musicians
American jazz composers
American male jazz composers
American jazz trombonists
Male trombonists
American jazz trumpeters
American male trumpeters
Grammy Award winners
American expatriates in Germany
Living people
21st-century trumpeters
Jazz musicians from Texas
21st-century trombonists
21st-century American male musicians